Recording a Tape the Colour of the Light is the debut release of Montreal-based instrumental act Bell Orchestre. On the back of the album, the track listing includes a track set off from the rest called (frost). On the iTunes Music Store, the last three minutes and fifty seconds of "Recording A Tunnel (The Invisible Bells)" are sold under the name "Frost" and "Recording A Tunnel (The Invisible Bells)" is shortened to 6:32 playing time.

Track listing
 "Recording a Tunnel (The Horns Play Underneath the Canal)" – 0:42
 "Les Lumières Pt. 1" – 6:17
 "Les Lumières Pt. 2" –3:50
 "Throw It on a Fire" – 4:46
 "Recording a Tunnel" – 1:53
 "The Upwards March" – 4:21
 "The Bells Play the Band" – 1:19
 "Recording a Tape... (Typewriter Duet)" – 3:41
 "Nuevo" – 5:51
 "Salvatore Amato" – 6:39
 "Recording a Tunnel (The Invisible Bells)" – 13:28

References 

2005 debut albums
Bell Orchestre albums
Rough Trade Records albums